Sumner Strait is a strait in the Alexander Archipelago in the southeastern region of the U.S. state of Alaska.

The fur trader William Brown was the first European to visit the strait about 1793. Later the same year James Johnstone, one of George Vancouver's officers during his 1791-95 expedition, charted it. It was named in 1875 by W. H. Dall in honor of Charles Sumner.

The Cape Decision Light is a notable aid-to-navigation on Sumner Strait.

References

Straits of Alaska
Straits of Prince of Wales–Hyder Census Area, Alaska
Bodies of water of Petersburg Borough, Alaska
Straits of Wrangell, Alaska